The  is an electric multiple unit (EMU) train type operated by the private railway operator Nankai Electric Railway in Japan since 1962.

Operations 
The 6000 series is used mainly on Nankai Koya Line commuter services.

Formations 
, the fleet consists of 11 two-car sets and seven four-car sets. Aside from six two-car sets, the "Mc1" cars are at the Osaka-Namba end. The sets are formed as follows.

2-car sets 
The "MoHa 6001" car faces Osaka-Namba on five sets. On the remaining six sets, the car faces Izumi-Chuo.

 The "Mc1" car is fitted with one scissors-type pantograph.

4-car sets 
The "MoHa 6001" car faces Osaka-Namba.

 The "Mc2" car is fitted with one scissors-type pantograph.

Interior 
All cars feature longitudinal seating throughout. Since these are older cars, they lack many features found in modern sets such as LCD screens and light-up maps.

History 
The first four batches arrived in seven three-car sets. The current 2-car and 4-car formations were formed in 1971.

The first set to be scrapped was four-car set 6035F on October 17, 2019. Since then, three more four-car sets as well as three two-car sets have been scrapped for a total of 22 cars being scrapped. It is generally rare for any rail car to last beyond 50 years in service. 

Two more 2-car sets were retired in March 2022: 6022 and 6034.

Resale 
Two-car set 6905 was transferred to the Ōigawa Railway in 2019.

Gallery

References

External links 

 Nankai rolling stock information 

Electric multiple units of Japan
Train-related introductions in 1962
Nankai Electric Railway rolling stock
Tokyu Car multiple units
600 V DC multiple units
1500 V DC multiple units of Japan